Juan Carlos Rodríguez may refer to:

 Juan Carlos (footballer, born 1965), Spanish footballer
 Juan Carlos Rodríguez (boxer) (born 1990), Venezuelan boxer
 Juan Carlos Rodríguez Ibarra (born 1948), Spanish politician
 Juan Carlos Rodríguez (judoka) (born 1956), Spanish Olympic judoka
 Juan Carlos Rodríguez (singer), singer with Tercer Cielo

See also 
 Juan Rodríguez (disambiguation)
 Juan Carlos (disambiguation)